Saint-Isidore is a community in Gloucester County, New Brunswick, Canada. It held village status prior to 2023. It is adjacent to the communities of Pont-Landry, Hacheyville, Bois-Gagnon and Tilley Road. The community is situated on the Acadian Peninsula.

Saint-Isidore is in the town of Tracadie-Sheila's sphere of influence. With the population being Acadian, almost all of its inhabitants speak French as a mother tongue and are of the Catholic religion. The local school name is École la Relève and offers kindergarten through seventh grade classes.

The main industries are agriculture, asphalt and services. The village maintains a local museum, a public pool and a few parks around the municipality. It is crossed by provincial Route 160 and Route 135.

History

The settlement was founded by Rev. Gagnon in 1876 and merged with the community of Bois-Hébert which was incorporated in 1991 as the current Village de Saint-Isidore.  The first mayor ever elected was Norbert J. Sivret. The Acadian influence is represented through the majestic local church, which was built in 1904.

On 1 January 2023, Saint-Isidore amalgamated with the village of Paquetville and all or part of six local service districts to form the new town of Hautes-Terres. The community's name remains in official use.

Demographics 

Notable people

 include AIDS activist Dr. Réjean Thomas and opera singer Michèle Losier, both now living in Montreal, Quebec.

See also
List of communities in New Brunswick

References

Communities in Gloucester County, New Brunswick
Former villages in New Brunswick